The 1994–95 Midland Football Alliance season was the first in the history of Midland Football Alliance, a football competition in England.

The league was formed, drawing its initial membership from the strongest clubs in the Midland Football Combination and the West Midlands (Regional) League, both of which became feeder leagues to the new competition.

Clubs
The league featured 20 clubs which competed in the Midland Football Combination and the West Midlands (Regional) League last season.

Ten clubs joined from the Midland Football Combination:

Barwell
Bolehall Swifts
Boldmere St. Michaels
Pershore Town
Sandwell Borough
Shepshed Albion, who also changed name to Shepshed Dynamo
Shifnal Town
Stapenhill
Stratford Town
West Midlands Police

Ten clubs joined from the West Midlands (Regional) League:

Brierley Hill Town
Chasetown
Halesowen Harriers
Hinckley Athletic
Knypersley Victoria
Oldbury United
Paget Rangers
Rocester
Rushall Olympic
Willenhall Town

League table

References

External links
 Midland Football Alliance

1994–95
8